Nathaniel Curzon, 2nd Baron Scarsdale (27 September 1752 – 27 January 1837) was an English Tory politician and peer.

Early life

Curzon was the son of Nathaniel Curzon, 1st Baron Scarsdale of Kedleston Hall, and his wife Lady Caroline Colyear. Among his siblings were Admiral Henry Curzon of the Royal Navy who held commands during the French Revolutionary Wars and the Napoleonic Wars.

His paternal grandparents were Sir Nathaniel Curzon, 4th Baronet (an MP for Derby, Clitheroe, and Derbyshire) and the former Mary Assheton (a daughter of Sir Ralph Assheton, 2nd Baronet, MP for Lancashire and Liverpool). Among his uncles were Assheton Curzon, 1st Viscount Curzon.

His mother was the eldest daughter of Charles, Earl of Portmore and Juliana Osborne, Duchess of Leeds (widow of Peregrine Osborne, 3rd Duke of Leeds).

Career
After contemplating, but not standing at the general election of 1774, Curzon was returned unopposed as Member of Parliament for Derbyshire in February 1775. He is not recorded as having spoken in the House, but the English Chronicle reported in 1780 that "he gives a silent vote always with the ministry." In 1784 Curzon canvassed for re-election, but met with "a serious opposition" in the county, and withdrew before the election.

In 1804 he succeeded his father to the title Lord Scarsdale.

Personal life

On 11 August 1777, Curzon married Hon. Sophia-Susanna Noel, daughter of Edward Noel, 1st Viscount Wentworth and the former Judith Lamb (daughter and heiress of William Lamb of Wilby). Her brother was Thomas Noel, 2nd Viscount Wentworth. Before her death in 1782, there were three children of the marriage, including:

 Nathaniel Curzon, 3rd Baron Scarsdale (1781–1856), who died unmarried.
 Hon. Sophia Caroline Curzon (1779–1849), who married Robert Sewallis Shirley, styled Viscount Tamworth, eldest son and heir apparent of Robert Shirley, 7th Earl Ferrers, in 1800.

On 18 November 1798, he remarried to Felicite Anne Josephe de Wattines (1767–1850) at Hamburg. She was a daughter of Francois Josephe des Wattines, of Heslin, France. Before his death, they were the parents of ten children, including:

 Hon. Alfred Curzon (1801–1850), the Rector of Kedleston 1832 to 1850; he married Sophia Holden, second daughter of Robert Holden, of Nuthall Temple, in 1825.
 Hon. Francis James Curzon (1803–1851), a barrister-at-law.
 Hon. Felicite Anne Josephe Curzon (d. 1844)
 Hon. Mary Elizabeth Curzon (d. 1868), who married John Beaumont, of Barrow, in 1825.
 Hon. Caroline Esther Curzon (d. 1886), who married William Drury-Lowe, of Locko Park, in 1827.

Lord Scarsdale died on 27 January 1837 and was buried at Kedleston. His eldest son Nathaniel succeeded to the title and became Lord Scarsdale.

References

1752 births
1837 deaths
Members of the Parliament of Great Britain for English constituencies
British MPs 1774–1780
British MPs 1780–1784
Nathaniel
Barons in the Peerage of Great Britain